The Real Housewives is an American reality television franchise that began on March 21, 2006 with The Real Housewives of Orange County. Each installment of the franchise documents the personal and professional lives of a group of affluent women residing in or around a certain city or geographic region. 11 different series have been produced in the United States, with another 21 international adaptations. (Though one U.S. production, The Real Housewives of Dubai, is set outside of the U.S.) The American series are primarily broadcast on Bravo, with one installment broadcast on Peacock.

The first international adaptation, The Real Housewives of Athens, premiered on March 4, 2011. The longest-running international adaptation is The Real Housewives of Cheshire, which has aired 15 seasons.

The American franchise has led to 27 spin-off series in all; the most successful, Vanderpump Rules, has itself had a number of spin-offs.

History
On May 1, 2005, The Real Housewives was first announced as one of six reality television shows ordered by the American television network Bravo.The show was inspired by scripted soap operas including Desperate Housewives and Peyton Place, and would document the lives of upper-class women who "lead glamorous lives in a picturesque Southern California gated community where the average home has a $1.6 million price tag and residents include CEOs and retired professional athletes."

The Real Housewives of Orange County 
In January 2006, the show was announced as The Real Housewives of Orange County. However, filming began in 2005 under the title Behind the Gates.

The first season aired on Bravo from March 21 to May 9, 2006. The original cast consisted of Kimberly Bryant, Jo De La Rosa, Vicki Gunvalson, Jeana Keough and Lauri Waring.

The show has had three spin-offs: Date My Ex: Jo & Slade, Tamra’s OC Wedding and Glitter Town.

The Real Housewives of New York City 
In September 2007, the network started production for the show Manhattan Moms. In January 2008, the show was re-titled to The Real Housewives of New York City, becoming the second installment in the franchise.

The first season aired on Bravo from March 4 to May 27, 2008. The original cast consisted of Luann de Lesseps, Bethenny Frankel, Alex McCord, Ramona Singer and Jill Zarin.

The show has had three spin-offs: Bethenny Ever After, Bethenny & Fredrik and Luann and Sonja: Welcome to Crappie Lake.

The Real Housewives of Atlanta 
In June 2008, the third installment in the franchise, The Real Housewives of Atlanta, was announced.

The first season aired on Bravo from October 7 to November 25, 2008. The original cast consisted of NeNe Leakes, DeShawn Snow, Shereé Whitfield, Lisa Wu and Kim Zolciak.

The show has had ten spin-offs: Don't Be Tardy, The Kandi Factory, I Dream of NeNe: The Wedding, Kandi's Wedding, Kandi's Ski Trip, Xscape: Still Kickin' It, Kandi Koated Nights, Porsha's Having a Baby, Porsha's Family Matters and Kandi & The Gang.

The Real Housewives of New Jersey 
In May 2008, the fourth installment in the franchise, The Real Housewives of New Jersey, was announced, before the announcement of the Atlanta installment.

The first season aired on Bravo from May 12 to July 8, 2009. The original cast consisted of Teresa Giudice, Jacqueline Laurita, Caroline Manzo, Dina Manzo and Danielle Staub.

The show has had three spin-offs: Boys to Manzo, Manzo'd with Children and Teresa Checks In.

The Real Housewives of D.C. 
In October 2009, the fifth installment in the franchise, The Real Housewives of D.C., was announced.

The season aired on Bravo from August 5 to October 21, 2010. The cast consisted of Mary Amons, Lynda Erkiletian, Cat Ommanney, Michaele Salahi and Stacie Scott Turner.

The show ended after one season, becoming the first franchise to be canceled; its cancellation came after one of the cast members, Salahi, and her husband Tareq caused controversy by successfully entering the White House uninvited for a state dinner while being filmed for the show.

The Real Housewives of Beverly Hills 
In March 2010, the sixth installment in the franchise, The Real Housewives of Beverly Hills, was announced.

The first season aired on Bravo from October 14, 2010 to February 15, 2011. The original cast consisted of Taylor Armstrong, Camille Grammer, Adrienne Maloof, Kim Richards, Kyle Richards and Lisa Vanderpump.

The show has had two spin-offs: Vanderpump Rules and Vanderpump Dogs. Vanderpump Rules has itself had two additional spin-offs: Vanderpump Rules After Show and Vanderpump Rules: Jax And Brittany Take Kentucky.

The Real Housewives of Miami 
In March 2010, the network ordered a show titled Miami Social Club, which would serve as a reconstruction of Miami Social. The show was later re-titled to The Real Housewives of Miami, becoming the seventh installment in the franchise.

The first season aired on Bravo from February 22 to April 5, 2011. The original cast consisted of Lea Black, Adriana de Moura, Alexia Echevarria, Marysol Patton, Larsa Pippen and Cristy Rice.

After an eight year hiatus, the fourth season aired on Peacock from December 16, 2021 to March 10, 2022. The rebooted cast consisted of Guerdy Abraira, Lisa Hochstein, Julia Lemigova, Nicole Martin, Alexia Nepola and Larsa Pippen.

The show has had one spin-off: Havana Elsa.

The Real Housewives of Potomac 
In November 2015, the eighth installment in the franchise, The Real Housewives of Potomac, was announced. The series had the working title Potomac Ensemble prior to the announcement.

The first season aired on Bravo from January 17 to April 17, 2016. The original cast consisted of Gizelle Bryant, Ashley Darby, Robyn Dixon, Karen Huger, Charrisse Jackson-Jordan and Katie Rost.

The show has had one spin-off: Karen's Grande Dame Reunion.

The Real Housewives of Dallas 
Prior to being announced, the show was initially titled Ladies of Dallas during its early production, a potential spin-off to Ladies of London.

In November 2015, the ninth installment in the franchise, The Real Housewives of Dallas, was announced.

The first season aired on Bravo from April 11 to June 19, 2016. The original cast consisted of Cary Deuber, Tiffany Hendra, Stephanie Hollman, LeeAnne Locken and Brandi Redmond.

On August 17, 2021, the network announced that they had no plans to immediately renew the show for a sixth season, placing it on an indefinite hiatus.

The Real Housewives of Salt Lake City 
In November 2019, the tenth installment in the franchise, The Real Housewives of Salt Lake City, was announced.

The first season aired on Bravo from November 11, 2020 to February 24, 2021. The original cast consisted of Lisa Barlow, Mary Cosby, Heather Gay, Meredith Marks, Whitney Rose and Jen Shah.

The Real Housewives of Dubai 
On November 1, 2021, the eleventh installment in the franchise, The Real Housewives of Dubai, was announced. The show is the network's first non-U.S. installment of the franchise.

The first season aired on Bravo from June 1 to September 7, 2022. The original cast consisted of Nina Ali, Chanel Ayan, Caroline Brooks, Sara Al Madani, Lesa Milan and Caroline Stanbury.

List of shows
Bravo has broadcast 11 American installments of the franchise, beginning with The Real Housewives of Orange County on March 21, 2006. The network has also licensed the brand to various networks outside the United States, giving rise to more than a dozen international installments.

The success of the American franchise has resulted in 26 spin-offs centered on specific housewives, with the longest-running being Vanderpump Rules, which focuses on the staff at the restaurants and bars owned by Lisa Vanderpump from The Real Housewives of Beverly Hills.

In November 2021, the eleventh installment in the franchise, The Real Housewives of Dubai, was announced as the networks first original international installment of the franchise.

American installments

 Currently airing installments.
 Installment with an upcoming season.
 Installment with an unknown status.
 Installment is currently under development.
 Installment no longer in development.

International installments

{| class="wikitable sortable plainrowheaders" style="text-align:center;"
|+ Installments of The Real Housewives that originated internationally
|-
! scope="col" style="width:20em;" | Series
!
! scope="col" style="width:10em;" | Country
! scope="col" style="width:10em;"  | Network
! scope="col" style="width:10em;"  | Series premiere
! scope="col" style="width:10em;"  | Series finale
! scope="col" | No. ofseasons
|- 
| bgcolor="F0ADAB"| The Real Housewives of Melbourne
| bgcolor="F0ADAB"|RHOMelbourne
| rowspan="3"| 
| Arena (s. 1–4) FOX Arena (s. 5)
| 
| 
| 5
|-
| bgcolor="F0ADAB"|The Real Housewives of Sydney
| bgcolor="F0ADAB"|RHOS
| Arena
| 
| 
| 1
|-
| bgcolor="F1E5C9" nowrap|The Real Housewives of the Gold Coast
| bgcolor="F1E5C9"| RHOGC
| TBA
| 
| 
| 1
|-
| bgcolor="F0ADAB"|The Real Housewives of Vancouver
| bgcolor="F0ADAB"|RHOV
| rowspan="2"| 
| rowspan="2"| Slice
| 
| 
| 2
|-
| bgcolor="F0ADAB"|The Real Housewives of Toronto
| bgcolor="F0ADAB"|RHOT
| 
| 
| 1
|-
| bgcolor="F0ADAB"|Les Vraies Housewives
| bgcolor="F0ADAB"|LVH
| 
| NT1
| 
| 
| 1
|-
| bgcolor="F0ADAB"|The Real Housewives of Athens
| bgcolor="F0ADAB"|RHOAthens
| 
| ANT1
| 
| 
| 1
|-
| bgcolor="F0ADAB"| The Real Housewives of Hungary
| bgcolor="F0ADAB"| RHOH
| 
| Viasat 3
| 
| 
| 4
|-
| bgcolor="F0ADAB"|The Real Housewives di Napoli
| bgcolor="F0ADAB"|RHODN
| 
| nowrap|DPlay Plus (s. 1)Real Time (s. 1)  Discovery+ (s. 2)
| 
| 
| 2
|-
| bgcolor="A6EC99"| The Real Housewives of Nairobi
| bgcolor="A6EC99"|RHONairobi
| 
| Showmax
| 
| 
| 1
|-
| bgcolor="D8B2FA"|The Real Housewives of Amsterdam
| bgcolor="D8B2FA"|RHOAMS
| 
| Videoland
| 
| 
| 1
|-
|-
| bgcolor="F0ADAB"| The Real Housewives of Auckland
| bgcolor="F0ADAB"|RHOAKL
| 
| Bravo
| 
| 
| 1
|-
| bgcolor="D8B2FA"|The Real Housewives of Lagos
| bgcolor="D8B2FA"|RHOL
| rowspan="2" |
| rowspan="2" |Showmax
| 
| 
| 1
|-
| bgcolor="A6EC99"|The Real Housewives of Abuja
| bgcolor="A6EC99" | RHOAbuja
| 
| 
| 1
|-
| bgcolor="D8B2FA"| The Real Housewives of Johannesburg
| bgcolor="D8B2FA"|RHOJ| rowspan="5" | 
| 1Magic
| 
| 
| 2
|-
| bgcolor="A6EC99"|The Real Housewives of Durban| bgcolor="A6EC99"|RHODurban| rowspan="1"| Showmax
| 
| 
| 3
|-
| bgcolor="D8B2FA"|The Real Housewives of Cape Town| bgcolor="D8B2FA"|RHOCT| Mzansi Magic
| 
|
| 1
|-
| bgcolor="D8B2FA"|Die Real Housewives van Pretoria| bgcolor="D8B2FA"|RHOPTA|KykNET
| 
| 
| 1
|-
| bgcolor="A6EC99"|The Real Housewives of Gqeberha| bgcolor="A6EC99"|RHOGQ|1Magic
|February 3, 2023
|
|
|-
| bgcolor="D8B2FA"|The Real Housewives of Cheshire| bgcolor="D8B2FA"|RHOCheshire| rowspan="2" nowrap| 
| rowspan="2"| ITVBe
| 
| 
| 15
|-
| bgcolor="F0ADAB"|The Real Housewives of Jersey| bgcolor="F0ADAB"|RHOJersey| 
| 
| 2
|-
| bgcolor="F0ADAB"|The Real Housewives of Slovenia| bgcolor="F0ADAB"|RHOSlovenia| rowspan="2" |
| rowspan="2" |Planet TV
| 
| 
| 1
|}

 Spin-offs 

 Other reality TV shows starring Real Housewives 

Format and recurring elements

Each series focuses on the lives and social dynamics of a core group of around five to seven women in a particular city or geographic area. Cast members are typically relatively wealthy, middle-aged women. Scenes may depict cast members' personal and professional lives, and especially their social interactions with one another. Individual scenes may feature any combination of cast members (including solo scenes), though producers aim to include at least one "tent-pole" event per episode, which brings together the full cast. A single season typically consists of around 25 episodes.

The franchise has been described as a "docu-soap"— a hybrid of the reality television and soap opera genres. The shows are not scripted, but field producers often intervene to steer the direction of conversations or inflame conflicts.

Opening credits and taglines

A highly recognizable and frequently parodied feature of the franchise is its opening credits, which feature clips and green screen footage of each housewife in turn, with each housewife delivering a "tagline"—a short quip alluding to some aspect of their personality or story. For example, for season six of The Real Housewives of Beverly Hills, Lisa Vanderpump, who runs a dog rescue organization, used the tagline "I'm passionate about dogs, just not crazy about bitches". Housewives record several taglines for a given season, some of which may be written by the housewife herself and some by producers, with the network having final say on which one is used.

The credits end with a title card showing a lineup of the entire cast holding in their outstretched hands an object related to the show's location. For example, the housewives of Orange County hold oranges, the cast of Atlanta hold peaches, and the women of Beverly Hills hold oversized diamonds. This began as an allusion to the opening credits of Desperate Housewives, which featured the show's main actresses holding apples, and the each object is often used as a symbolic reference for being a cast member on each respective show — for example, if a long-time guest on a franchise is finally cast to appear full time, her cast mates may say she has "finally earned her peach." The housewife in the center of the cast shot is generally chosen to be the cast member who had the greatest impact on the season.

Reunion episodes
Each season of a Real Housewives series ends with a "reunion", in which the cast members convene to discuss the events of the season. The reunion is generally filmed after most of the season has aired, and the women have had a chance to view the season's episodes. Reunions are filmed in a single day over the course of around ten hours, but are generally edited into two or three one-hour episodes. 

Housewives are typically paid for their participation in each season of the program in two separate amounts, with the second portion paid to the Housewives after the filming of the reunion. When Adrienne Maloof failed to show up for The Real Housewives of Beverly Hills season three reunion in 2013, a precedent was set where, with the exception of certain circumstances such as attending an alcohol rehabilitation facility, the Housewife's employment as a cast member on the program is terminated if she is a no-show. Housewives to skip the reunion and not return to the series in the next season include Maloof, Mary Cosby (Salt Lake City), Jacqueline Laurita (New Jersey) and Lisa Vanderpump (Beverly Hills).

Cast members are seated on couches on either side of a host (Andy Cohen, in the case of the American editions) who asks the cast questions (sometimes viewer-submitted) about the events of the season. The closer a Housewife sits to the host, the more integral the part she played in the drama and storyline that season. By 2016, entertainment websites were analyzing the importance of the reunion seating charts, with Slice noting that the Housewives assigned to the "end spots", meaning the ones farthest away from the host, meant a near-certain end to their time on Real Housewives. Housewives generally dress formally, in evening or cocktail dresses, for reunions.

In addition to answering questions, the Housewives are given the chance to look back on video clips of events from the season, with their reactions shown to the audience via picture-in-picture. "Friends of the Housewives", part-time cast members, typically only appear for a portion of the reunion time. In many but not all U.S. Real Housewives installments, a segment of the reunion is filmed with the husbands of the Housewives joining their spouses on stage and giving their thoughts on what happened during the filming of the season. The first show to debut such a segment was The Real Housewives of Orange County in 2010, and many production companies now consider spouse participation to be standard fare on reunion day. The vast majority of reunion specials end with the cast making a toast, signifying a formal end to the season. In many cases production makes note of offering non-alcoholic toasts to Housewives who have quit drinking alcohol, or who are pregnant.

The final episode of the first season of The Real Housewives of Orange County, the franchise's original incarnation, diverged from the now-standard reunion format; it lacked a host, and the women dressed casually and cordially reminisced over the course of a single episode, set in the backyard of one of the women. The reunion for the second season, then titled "Real Housewives Confess: A Watch What Happens Special", was the first to feature Andy Cohen as host, and to use the talk show-like format which subsequent reunions would adopt. From then on, a standard season-ending reunion would play out across two episodes, with season three of The Real Housewives of New York City debuting the franchise's first-ever three-part reunion in June 2010. In the years since, three-part reunions have become commonplace on many U.S. Housewives series, and in April 2017 The Real Housewives of Atlanta ended its ninth season with a four-part reunion special. The four-part reunion special format was later duplicated by the Potomac and Beverly Hills installments in 2021.

During the COVID-19 pandemic in 2020, the season 12 and season 10 reunions of Atlanta and Beverly Hills were filmed virtually, on Zoom, from the homes of Cohen and the Housewives due to lockdown orders at the time.

Production
Each Real Housewives program is made by a different production company, though some are responsible for more than one show. For example, Evolution Media produces both The Real Housewives of Orange County and The Real Housewives of Beverly Hills. A season is shot on location over the course of around four to six months. The typical field crew for a show consists of three production crews of around ten people, including one lead producer, several camera crew, and a sound technician. Small scenes, such as those centered on just one or two housewives, are shot by a single production crew, whereas multiple crews will cover larger events involving most of the cast.

The postproduction process of putting episodes together takes around ten to twelve weeks, and begins near the end of filming. Estimates for the amount of raw footage recorded per hour-long episode have ranged from 40 to 85 hours.

Casting

While early seasons occasionally made use of open casting calls, potential housewives are more typically referred by existing cast members or invited to interview by casting agents as a result of their research into the city's social circles. Candidates must pass through three stages: a phone interview with a casting director, a video interview, and finally a filmed home visit, simulating the process of filming a scene for the show. 

The casting of Housewives' family members as primary cast members has occurred many times, with The Real Housewives of New Jersey casting siblings in its first season. This particular installment of the franchise would later cast sisters-in-law, cousins, and even twin sisters. The first mother-daughter Housewives, Evodia and Mercy Mogase from The Real Housewives of Johannesburg, eventually received their own spinoff program in 2020.

Contracts
The compensation of Real Housewives cast members has been the subject of some speculation. In his book about the Housewives franchise, writer Brian Moylan estimates that, as of 2021, a cast member would receive around $60,000 for her first season, increasing year over year up to a cap of around 300 to 500 thousand dollars. Certain "star" cast members have been rumored to be paid figures in the low millions, such as NeNe Leakes, and Kandi Burruss of The Real Housewives of Atlanta, Lisa Vanderpump of The Real Housewives of Beverly Hills, and Tamra Judge of The Real Housewives of Orange County. In the early years of the franchise, cast members were paid considerably less, with Real Housewives of New York City cast member Bethenny Frankel stating that she was paid $7,250 for her appearance on the show's first season in 2008.

A notable provision of housewives' contracts is the so-called "Bethenny clause", which states that Bravo receives 10% of the sale price of any business a cast member starts while on the show, provided that it sells for more than 1 million dollars. The colloquial name for the clause is in reference to Bethenny Frankel, who sold her Skinnygirl cocktail line in 2011 for a reported $120 million.

Confessional interviews
Like many reality television shows, the Real Housewives franchise makes use of confessional interviews, in which scenes are interspersed with "talking head" commentary from the cast members.  Confessional interviews were originally filmed at the housewives' homes, but are now mostly shot on a soundstage in front of a green screen, with an image of the cast member's home composited behind them. Interviews are filmed periodically during and after the filming of a season, sometimes over the course of a full day, and involve the women responding to questions from an off-screen producer. Over the years, cast members have adopted increasingly elaborate hair, makeup, and fashions for confessional interviews, and may spend between 45 minutes and three hours before filming in order to prepare their looks with the help of hair and makeup artists. Each cast member typically has three different confessional looks for a season, with some franchises adopting up to seven, which may need to be reproduced in multiple interview sessions for the sake of continuity. Confessional looks must be approved in advance by producers and the network.

Potential additional locations
On December 2, 2016, Cohen spoke on the future of the franchise, saying if there were to be a new installment to the franchise, it could potentially be set in Nashville. Cohen also stated that an All Star edition of the franchise would serve as an end-goal if ratings began to drop. Later in December 2016, during an interview with Harry Connick Jr., Cohen stated that they look for cities with strong personalities, and agreed that New Orleans fits that criterion.

Cities where Cohen and other producers began the casting process but ultimately decided not to create a series include Chicago, Greenwich, Houston and San Francisco.

Criticism
Feminist leader Gloria Steinem has vociferously criticized the Real Housewives franchise for "presenting women as rich, pampered, dependent and hateful towards each other."

Others have criticized the show for its promotion of conspicuous consumption. The franchise is often analyzed through a lens of feminist political economy, and how the show "creates rich women as objects of cultural derision, well-heeled jesters in a populist court."

In October 2019, The New York Times ran an article criticizing how the casts of the different Real Housewives installments appear "segregated" by skin color. Author Tracie Egan Morrissey pointed to Potomac and Atlanta for their almost entirely African American casts, while the other iterations, such as Beverly Hills, Orange County, Dallas, New York, and New Jersey, are overwhelmingly white and have featured few women of color. The Real Housewives of New York did not have an African-American cast member until 2021; while the addition of Kary Brittingham to Dallas in 2019 marked the show's first Hispanic cast member. Beverly Hills, with the exception of season four’s Joyce Giraud, featured "a racially homogeneous cast throughout its run", until the addition of Garcelle Beauvais in 2019 and Crystal Kung-Minkoff in 2021.

The Real Housewives of Dubai installment, which premiered on June 1, 2022, has been the subject of criticism due to its setting in Dubai, United Arab Emirates. On May 25, 2022, a group of 12 human rights organizations, including Freedom Forward, CODEPINK and FairSquare, wrote an open letter to Andy Cohen and other executives condemning the decision to film a show there, citing the Dubai and UAE governments' purported homophobia and women's rights violations. The groups asked the producers to reveal the financial role of the UAE in the series' production, run a disclaimer, and publicly cite past human rights abuses committed by the emirate.

Syndication
The first four installments entered weekday broadcast syndication in the majority of United States markets on September 13, 2010, with episodes of The Real Housewives of Orange County. The Real Housewives of Atlanta started airing episodes in the syndicated time slot on October 25, 2010; The Real Housewives of New York City on November 29, 2010; and The Real Housewives of New Jersey on January 17, 2011. More episodes of Orange County and an encore of Atlanta finished off the season.

Parodies
Since the conception of the series, The Real Housewives franchise has been parodied in television, film, theatre and online media.

Television
Series
 Real Husbands of Hollywood is a reality television parody show broadcast on BET from January 15, 2013 to December 13, 2016, created by Kevin Hart. The show ran for five seasons, before being revived on BET+ in February 2022.
 The Hotwives is a sitcom parody show broadcast on Hulu from July 15, 2014 to September 15, 2015. The show ran for two seasons. The first season was set in Orlando, Florida, while the second was set in Las Vegas.
 In Kenya, a parody of The Real Housewives began airing in July 2014, titled Real Househelps of Kawangware. The show was added to the South African mobile streaming service ShowMax in October 2016.

Episodes
 The 30 Rock episodes "Queen of Jordan" (2011) and "Queen of Jordan 2: Mystery of the Phantom Pooper" (2012) were both structured as episodes of a fictional reality show called Queen of Jordan which parodied several personalities and events of The Real Housewives franchise, particularly The Real Housewives of New Jersey. The 2012 episode "Idiots Are People Three!" also featured Denise Richards parodying LuAnn de Lesseps's song "Chic, C'est La Vie" as "J'adore La Piscine".
 The 2022 episode "The Real Rodents of Little Rodentia" of the Disney+ series Zootopia+ parodies the format of The Real Housewives;  Crystal Kung Minkoff from Beverly Hills and Porsha Williams from Atlanta make guest appearances voicing two of Fru Fru's friends.

Sketches
 From 2009 to 2012, a recurring sketch titled The Real Housewives of Late Night aired on The Tonight Show Starring Jimmy Fallon. The sketch featured the men dressing up as their wives in a parody of The Real Housewives franchise.
 On November 2, 2010, Saturday Night Live parodied The Real Housewives franchise as a whole, with a segment titled Women of SNL. The segment was stylized as though it were a reunion special, which guest starred Andy Cohen making a cameo as the host for the segment. The skit featured classic housewives moments spoofed by many women who are a part of Saturday Night Live, including Rachel Dratch, Nora Dunn, Tina Fey, Ana Gasteyer, Julia Louis-Dreyfus, Laraine Newman, Cheri Oteri, Amy Poehler, Maya Rudolph, Molly Shannon, and Kristen Wiig.
 Saturday Night Live parodied The Real Housewives again on March 3, 2012, with a sketch called Real Housewives of Disney guest starring Lindsay Lohan as Rapunzel.
 On November 5, 2014, a parody titled Housewives of Narromine aired in Australia, on ABC's Indigenous sketch show, Black Comedy. The skit featured back and forth comedy between two characters located in Narromine, played by Deborah Mailman and Elizabeth Wymarra.
 From May 24 to November 8, 2015, the Australian sketch show Open Slather frequently parodied the series with the sketch The Real Housewives of The World. The sketch featured prominent women in politics in the format of The Real Housewives. The cast included Marg Downey as Helen Clark, Gina Riley as Hillary Clinton and Magda Szubanski as Angela Merkel. In the same series, Gina Riley also played a parodied version of The Real Housewives of Melbourne cast member Gina Liano.
 On June 16, 2016, the franchise was parodied in episode 9 in the fourth season of Inside Amy Schumer. Amy Schumer parodied The Real Housewives reunion with Andy Cohen making a guest appearance as himself, as the host.
 In New Zealand, a parody series called Fresh Housewives of South Auckland aired on TV2 during the Saturday morning segment Fresh and was released online. It ran for eight episodes from November September 11, to November 2, 2016.
 In January 2017, the BBC2 comedy show Revolting aired the sketch "The Real Housewives of ISIS", which featured women affiliated with the terrorist organization in the style of The Real Housewives franchise.

Film
 On February 25, 2011, Third Degree Films released a pornographic parody film of the franchise, titled The Real Housewives of San Fernando Valley.
 In February 2014, Michael Kulich produced a pornographic film called The Real Housewives of Westport featuring Nina Hartley.

Theatre
 The series was parodied in August 2012 by the musical The Real Drunk Housewives of the San Fernando Valley, which featured Rachel Reilly.
 The musical parody The Real Housewives of Walnut Creek ran in April and May 2014 at Lesher Center for the Arts in Walnut Creek, California. The musical was created by Molly Bell, who also starred, and was presented by the Center REPertory. In April 2016, the musical was restaged as Real Housewives of Toluca Lake at the Falcon Theatre in Burbank, California.
 In the United Kingdom, the theater production The Real Hoosewives - Fae Glesga ran from September 10 to September 14, 2014, at the Pavilion Theatre in Glasgow.
 From January to May, 2016, a performance titled The Realish Housewives: A Parody toured cities across the United States. Each performance was titled "The Realish Housewives of [the city they performed in]".
 From July 16 to September 12, 2016, a parody theater piece called Housewives of Secaucus, a Suburban Travesty was shown in New Jersey and New York across several venues. The show also parodied reality television series Jersey Shore and Mob Wives In October 2016, a musical titled The Real Wicked Witches of Halloween Hills was performed over 2 nights on October 29 and October 30, at Westchester Broadway Theatre and Emelin Theatre in New York. The musical is a family-friendly Halloween take on The Real Housewives franchise.

Web series
 The 2009 online series The unReal Housewives of Kansas City had seven episodes in all. It was directed by Jon Davis, and starred Michelle Davidson, Meagan Flynn, Erin McGrane, Tasha Smith and Jennifer Plas. Davidson, Flynn and Plas also served as writers for the series.
 The Real Housewives of South Boston is a YouTube parody series created by Lucia Aniello and Paul W. Downs in October 2011.
 Real Housewives of Benning Road is a YouTube parody series created Brooks and Amon Williams of Hardhead Films. The series aired for 3 seasons between 2013 and 2014.
 Nerdist aired The Real Housewives of Horror, from October 29 to December 4, 2014. The series is written and created by Brea Grant, who also stars in the series, and is a mash-up of the horror movie genre and The Real Housewives franchise.
 On April 12, 2015, former Big Brother contestant Wil Hueser released a video titled The Real Housewives of Louisville on his YouTube channel, which went on to serve as the first season. On June 16, 2016, Hueser began airing a second season of his series. The series features Hueser parodying multiple women from Louisville, including his own mother.
 In late August 2016, Real Housewives of Christchurch began airing as an online series. The series is designed as a parody of The Real Housewives of Auckland and showcases everyday women, rather than the wealthy and polished women featured on the Auckland series. In September 2016, cast-members of The Real Housewives of Auckland, Gilda Kirkpatrick and Anne Batley-Burton, were featured in a video meeting with the ladies of The Real Housewives of Christchurch.
 In October 2016, a web series titled The Real Houseboys of Waiheke began airing as a parody of The Real Housewives and more specifically The Real Housewives of Auckland.
 In a collaboration with Bravo, Mashable began airing an online mini-series titled The Real Housekids. It began on August 1, 2016, and featured children recreating well-known scenes from the franchise. In total four episodes were released, three featuring scenes from The Real Housewives of Atlanta and one featuring a scene from The Real Housewives of Orange County.
 In 2017 Jimmy Tatro and Christian A. Pierce created The Real Bros of Simi Valley, which premiered on YouTube and later moved to Facebook Watch in season 2.

Web-based sketches
 On August 14, 2012, The Real Housekeepers of Long Island was released online as a parody of the series, created by Tyler Gildin.
 On October 12, 2012, a segment was published on Funny or Die titled The Real Dragwives: Very Rich. The video is a parody of a scene from The Real Housewives of Atlanta, with Latrice Royale in the role of NeNe Leakes and DiDa Ritz in the role of Sheree Whitfield.
 In June 2015, Dirty Cues Productions produced the parody The Real Housewives of Westeros, combining the popular HBO show Game of Thrones with the Real Housewives franchise.
 On October 14, 2016, a parody video was released online called The Real Housewitches of Salem. The video parodied The Real Housewives as well as Hocus Pocus and Mean Girls.

Other parodies and allusions
 In 2009, Amy Phillips began impersonating stars from Bravo and many other celebrities on her YouTube channel and eventually began parodying the women from The Real Housewives. Since she began, Phillips has since been endorsed by Bravo and has made several appearances on Watch What Happens Live. In January 2016, Phillips parodied both The Real Housewives and Star Wars in Star Wars: The Housewives Awaken, during her segment Reality Checked with Amy Phillips, on SiriusXM's Radio Andy.
 On February 26, 2012, The Real Housewives was parodied during episode 2 of the fifth season of The Celebrity Apprentice, during a task sponsored by Medieval Times. Contestant and star of The Real Housewives of New Jersey Teresa Giudice recreated her table-flipping scene from The Real Housewives of New Jersey in a segment titled The Unreal Housewives of Camelot.
 In the 2013 film The Best Man Holiday, Melissa De Sousa's character "Shelby" is a star of the fictional reality show The Real Housewives of Westchester.
 In episode 9 of the fourth season of Hot in Cleveland, which aired on January 23, 2013, actress, and cast member of The Real Housewives of Orange County, Heather Dubrow guest starred as Nikki, the wife of Emmet (Alan Dale), who is trying to get on the fictional series True Housewives of Tampa St. Pete.
 SBS 2's The Feed parodied the franchise in August 2014, with a segment titled The Real Newsreaders Of Sydney. The segment featured Sandra Sully, Lee Lin Chin and Natalie Barr.
 On May 4, 2015, The Real Housewives was parodied during the tenth episode in the seventh season of RuPaul's Drag Race. In a mini-challenge titled Fake Housewives of RuPaul's Drag Race, the contestants were challenged to create a tagline, replicating the taglines of The Real Housewives franchise, as well as replicating plastic surgery using tape.
 The Real Tradies Of Melbourne is an online video released on July 29, 2015, created to promote awareness for Tradies National Health Month. The video features Shane Jacobson, as well as original The Real Housewives of Melbourne cast member Andrea Moss.
 On August 11, 2016, during an episode of Watch What Happens Live, Andy Cohen featured a segment titled The Real Housewives of Rio, inspired by the then-ongoing 2016 Summer Olympics. The segment featured current and former Olympians (like Nadia Comăneci) delivering Real Housewives-style taglines.
 On October 27, 2016, a scene from The Real Housewives of New York City, featuring Aviva Drescher throwing her prosthetic leg, was parodied by Alaska Thunderfuck 5000 during the reunion for the second season of RuPaul's Drag Race: All Stars.
 On October 26, 2016, the We the Voters campaign released a video online titled Real Voters of the USA, which used the format of The Real Housewives franchise to display that people could discuss politics without fighting. The video featured three housewives who were portrayed by Anabelle Acosta, Charlotte McKinney and Analeigh Tipton.
 In the fifth episode of Disney+ series High School Musical: The Musical: The Series, "The Real Campers of Shallow Lake", the characters are inspired by the Real Housewives'' franchise to act more dramatic so that the documentary crew filming them won't write them off as boring.

Awards and nominations 
The franchise has collectively won one Critics' Choice Television Award and four National Reality Television Awards, and has been nominated for 24 total National Reality Television Awards, 18 People's Choice Awards, 12 MTV Movie & TV Awards, four AACTA Awards, three Critics' Choice Real TV Awards, two Dorian Awards, a Leo Award, a TCA Award, a Canadian Screen Award, and a TRIC Award.

See also

List of The Real Housewives cast members

Citations

General and cited references

External links 
 

 
Bravo (American TV network) original programming